Roscommon was a constituency represented in the Irish House of Commons from 1611 to 1800. Between 1725 and 1793 Catholics and those married to Catholics could not vote.

Members of Parliament
1613–1615 Maurice Smith and William Marwood
1634–1635 George Carr and Edward Deane
1639–1649 Robert Bysse and Walter Loftus (died 1641)
1661–1666 Oliver Jones and William Somers

1689–1801

Notes

References

Historic constituencies in County Roscommon
Constituencies of the Parliament of Ireland (pre-1801)
1611 establishments in Ireland
1800 disestablishments in Ireland
Constituencies established in 1611
Constituencies disestablished in 1800